Punyi Pukur was a Bengali television soap that premiered on 7 December 2015 On Star Jalsha and aired every day at 9:30 PM IST. It was produced by Magic Moments Motion Pictures, and starred Monami Ghosh and Koushik Roy in lead roles and Aparajita Adhya, Bharat Kaul and Anushree Das among others in prominent supporting roles; while Debaparna Chakraborty essayed a negative role. The show replaced the popular show Jol Nupur.

Plot
Punyi Pukur follows the story of Kankon at her in-laws' house and how her relationship with her in-laws take turns with time. It is a story of Kankon, who lives in a village and since she was not getting married, Kankon and her mother, Hoimonti always had to listen her uncle's taunts. Kankon's father is tracking lover and gets missing from her birth. Kankon's aunt Basumati and her sister Chhuti is always in favor of Kankon. Kankon is very much interested in idol making from a localite, Biswanath, who has a past. Later, Kankon marries into a wealthy house in Kolkata.

Kankon's husband Somudro is a professor at a college and with time falls in love with Kankon. Kankon too loves him, but both, due to their ego and pride do not confess to each other. Meanwhile, Somudro doubts Kankon's childhood acquaintance, Riju to be Kankon's lover. It is revealed that Kankon's marriage was fixed to Riju but it never happened. Kankon does not love Riju, but Somudro keeps on doubting her. And, in order to make Kankon feel jealous, he tells her that his friend Sayoni and he are in love with each other. Kankon is very much hurt but does not give in, thinking that she is a village girl and unworthy of him.

To make Kankon even more jealous, he brings Sayoni home and asks Sayoni to act as his lover and act as if they would be marrying each other. Sayoni is revealed to be in love with Somudro since a long time. But Somudro has never considered Sayoni anything more than a friend. On the day of Somudro's birthday, in front of everyone, Sayoni attempts to put a ring on Somudro's finger. But Somudro immediately pulls his hand away and in front of everybody grabs Kankon's hand and confesses his love for her.

Cast

Main
 Monami Ghosh as Kankaboti Banerjee (née Mukherjee) aka Kakon – Chandra Shekhar-Hoimonti's daughter, Samudra's wife.
 Koushik Roy as 
 Prof. Somuddroneel Banerjee aka Somuddro / Pupul – Debjit-Shrestha's son, Radha's step/adoptive son, Saanji's younger brother and Kankon's husband
 Ronnie Golmes/Banerjee – Twin brother of Samudra estranged at birth.

Recurring
Banerjee family / Samudra's family
 Aparajita Adhya as Radharani Banerjee aka Radha – Debjit's first wife(divorced), Shrestha's elder cousin sister and Samudra's step/adoptive mother. Being divorced, she stayed back in the Banerjee residence and she didn't accept the signature on the divorce paper. (Deceased) 
 Bharat Kaul as Barrister Debjit Banerjee – Samudra's father, Radha and Shrestha's husband.
 Anushree Das as Barrister Shrestha Banerjee – Debjit's second wife, Radha's younger cousin, Samudra's mother.
 Ambarish Bhattacharya as Chandrajit Banerjee – Debjit's younger brother, Samudra's uncle.
 Rajanya Mitra as Koyel Banerjee – Chandrajit's wife, Samudra's aunt.
 Sohini Sanyal as Shahana Ganguly – Debjit's younger sister, Atri's mother.
 Bulbuli Choubey Panja as Saanji Banerjee – Debjit-Shrestha's daughter, Radha's step/adoptive daughter, Samudra's elder sister and Sourav's wife.
 Sudip Sarkar as Sourav – Saanjhi's husband and Samudra's brother-in-law.
 Anish Mukherjee as Atri Ganguly – Shahana's son, Samudra's younger cousin brother.
 Nabanita Malakar as Aratrika Banerjee aka Mimi – Atri's wife and Samudra's sister in law.
 Ayesha Bhattacharya as Joyeeta Banerjee aka Jiya - Chandrajit-Koyel's daughter, Samudra and Saanji's younger cousin sister, briefly Sourav's unwilling wife.

Mukherjee family / Kankon's family
 Chandan Sen as Chandra Shekhar Mukherjee – Kankon's father, Hoimonti's husband, estranged for a long period.
 Soma Banerjee as Hoimonti Mukherjee – Kankon's mother, Chandra Shekhar's wife.
 Sandeep De as Shyam Shankar Mukherjee – Chandra Shekhar's younger brother and Kankon's uncle, Basumati's husband.
 Rita Dutta Chakraborty as Basumati Mukherjee – Shyam Shankar's wife, Chhuti's mother, Kankon's aunt.
 Aishwarya Sen as Debasree Banerjee aka Chhuti – Shyam Shankar-Basumati's daughter, Kankon's younger cousin sister.
 Sourav Das as Sarbajit Majumdar – Chhuti's husband.

Others
 Santu Mukherjee as Bishwanath Pal aka Bishu –  Radha's elder brother-like man, a sculptor.
 Goutam De as Goutam Majumdar – Sarbajit's uncle.
 Sreela Majumdar as Saswati Majumdar – Sarbajit's aunt.
 Rahul Chakraborty as Dr. Dasgupta – Radha's sworn younger brother.
 Debaparna Chakraborty as Sayani Ghosh – Pupun's friend, who wants to marry him.
 Shankar Chakraborty as Aratrika's father.

References 

2015 Indian television series debuts
2017 Indian television series endings
Bengali-language television programming in India
Star Jalsha original programming